The WTA Tier I events are part of the elite tour for professional women's tennis organised by the WTA called the WTA Tour.

Tournaments

Results

See also 
 WTA Tier I events
 1997 WTA Tour
 1997 ATP Super 9
 1997 ATP Tour

References

External links
 Women's Tennis Association (WTA) official website
 International Tennis Federation (ITF) official website

WTA 1000 tournaments

 Tier 1